TNT Post may refer to:
 TNT Post Group, now known as PostNL
 TNT Post UK, now known as Whistl